Setiawangsa may refer to:
Setiawangsa
Setiawangsa (federal constituency), represented in the Dewan Rakyat